Anton Janos Jönsson Salétros (born 12 April 1996) is a Swedish professional footballer who plays as a midfielder for Ligue 2 club Caen.

Club career
On 6 June 2018, he signed a 4-year contract with the Russian Premier League club FC Rostov. He scored his first goal for the club on 26 September 2018 in a Russian Cup 4–0 victory over a third-tier club FC Syzran-2003.

On 6 February 2019, he returned to AIK on loan until 30 June 2019. The loan was then extended to 31 December 2019. On 14 February 2020, Sarpsborg 08 announced that they had signed Salétros on a loan deal that kept him at the club till the end of July 2020.

On 5 October 2020, Sarpsborg 08 announced the signing of Salétros on a two and a half-year contract, following his release by Rostov.

After three seasons in Norway, on 2 January 2023 Salétros joined French club Caen on a free transfer, signing a deal until June 2025.

International career 
Salétros was a part of the Sweden U17 team that finished third at the 2013 FIFA U-17 World Cup.

He made his senior international debut for the Sweden national team in a friendly game against Kosovo on 12 January 2020.

Personal life 
Salétros was born in Stockholm, Sweden. His father was born in Hungary.

Club statistics

Honours
Sweden U17
 FIFA U-17 World Cup Third place: 2013

References

External links

1996 births
Living people
Swedish people of Hungarian descent
Association football midfielders
Swedish footballers
Allsvenskan players
Nemzeti Bajnokság I players
Russian Premier League players
Eliteserien players
Ligue 2 players
Sweden youth international footballers
Sweden under-21 international footballers
Sweden international footballers
Enskede IK players
AIK Fotboll players
FC Rostov players
Újpest FC players
Sarpsborg 08 FF players
Stade Malherbe Caen players
Swedish expatriate footballers
Expatriate footballers in Russia
Expatriate footballers in Hungary
Expatriate footballers in Norway
Expatriate footballers in France
Swedish expatriate sportspeople in Russia
Swedish expatriate sportspeople in Hungary
Swedish expatriate sportspeople in Norway
Swedish expatriate sportspeople in France
Footballers from Stockholm